Bob Lord is a producer/composer/bassist and CEO of PARMA Recordings, parent company of label imprints Navona Records, Ravello, Big Round, MMC, and Capstone Records. He is also notable for being the bassist/composer of the experimental rock trio Dreadnaught, music director for the NHPR/Music Hall series Writers on a New England Stage, and in-studio producer of Grammy-winning clarinetist Richard Stoltzman.

He has more than 150 credits as a producer, executive producer, performer, arranger, label manager, and composer, and with Pete Townshend of The Who served as co-producer for the double-album release by Lawrence Ball, Method Music.

Career

Composer & bassist 
Lord's musical output spans the rock, classical, jazz, pop, film, and experimental genres, and he has composed, produced, and arranged for a wide cross-section of instrumentation, including orchestra ("James Thresher Industries"), rock band ("The Elevator Chaser"), piano ("Kazak, The Hound Of Space"), string orchestra ("Creepin'"), and electronics ("Agah Eegah"). His music is largely instrumental and generally eschews song format, with some exceptions ("Bony Cleave", "Danny").

As a recording artist, Lord has appeared on over 3 dozen releases and won numerous awards for his work. Dreadnaught's The American Standard (2001) was one of the best-reviewed progressive rock releases of its year, and the decade-long retrospective High Heat & Chin Music (2007) received a "Best Of NH 2007" award from New Hampshire Magazine. As a bassist he has been noted for his crisp tone (achieved through frequent use of a plectrum) and unusual bass lines.

Producer 
In 2002, while beginning preparations for what would become Dreadnaught's double-disc Live At Mojo (Comet Records), Lord began composing and producing music for film and other media; his work includes music for "Flying Downhill", a documentary on Olympic skier Bode Miller, "Marilyn's Man", a Marilyn Monroe documentary released by Universal, "Wander", an award-winning short film which aired on IFC, and the theme song for "The Exchange" from New Hampshire Public Radio.

Lord began producing for MMC Recordings in 2005 where he worked with Richard Stoltzman, Pixar/Randy Newman orchestrator Jonathan Sacks, and company owner and composer/pianist William Thomas McKinley among others, with credits on more than 30 releases over the next three years and recording with numerous orchestras, composers, ensembles, and players.

In 2008, Lord launched PARMA Recordings, an audio production company, and Navona Records, a classical imprint. In 2009, PARMA acquired the classical label Capstone Records and Big Round Records (previously owned by Congressman Paul Hodes), and launched Ravello Records, an imprint dedicated to modern classical music. In 2011, PARMA acquired MMC Recordings and the boutique online publisher ThatNewMusicWebsite/ThatNewMusicLibrary.

PARMA's releases include work by Pulitzer Prize winners Lewis Spratlan and Donald Martino, New York Philharmonic concertmaster Glenn Dicterow, former Congressman and Orleans founder John Hall, percussionist Steve Gadd, the London Symphony Orchestra, children's artist Raffi, and jazz bassist Eddie Gómez, violin and guitar ensemble Duo46 (music of John Carollo) among others.

In 2011, Lord served as co-producer with Pete Townshend of The Who for Lawrence Ball's Method Music, released in January 2012 on Navona Records. The album is a continuation of the concepts first explored in Townshend's Lifehouse project and Lifehouse Method website.

Performances 
Since its formation in 1996, Lord's primary performance vehicle has been Dreadnaught. The band began touring nationally in 2000 as a trio, performed in more than half of the U.S. states, and earned a reputation as a highly accomplished musical unit equally proficient in highly structured compositions and free-wheeling improvisation.

With Dreadnaught, Lord has shared a stage with John Entwistle (The Who), Tony Levin (Peter Gabriel, King Crimson), NRBQ, Jim Weider (The Band), California Guitar Trio, and the Young Dubliners. In 2005, the group began a prominent stint as house band for the New Hampshire Public Radio series Writers on a New England Stage at the Music Hall in Portsmouth, where it has performed with Stephen King, Dan Brown, Ken Burns, Alan Alda, John Updike, Elmore Leonard, Madeleine Albright, and Mitch Albom, among others.  The series has attracted international coverage and has been featured in press outlets such as The Today Show and Good Morning America.

In 2011, Lord served as on-air host for the NHPR/Music Hall live radio series Live@TheLoft, which featured the artists Buffalo Tom, Stew (musician) & The Negro Problem, Frazey Ford, and Patty Larkin.

Credits

Executive Producer/Producer (Partial List)

Product/Marketing/Imprint Credits (Partial List)

Composition/Production/Music Supervision For Media
Selected List

Music Director For Writers On A New England Stage (2005–present)

References

External links
Official Bob Lord website
Official PARMA Recordings website
Official Dreadnaught website
[ All-Music Guide Listing]
[ AllMusic review of "Live At Mojo"]
Ground And Sky review of "The American Standard"
Portland Phoenix review of "Musica En Flagrante
Writers On A New England Stage homepage at NHPR
Writers On A New England Stage homepage at the Music Hall website
New Hampshire Public Radio page for Live@TheLoft
'Ep. 120: Bob Lord, CEO of PARMA Recordings' Interview by Tigran Arakelyan

Musicians from New Hampshire
Businesspeople from New Hampshire
Living people
Year of birth missing (living people)